Temple B'Nai Israel is a Reform Jewish synagogue in Easton, Maryland. It is the only synagogue on Maryland's upper Eastern Shore.

History
The temple was formed in September 1951. In 1951, the synagogue had 50 members.

In 1989, Easton was home to a Jewish community of around 100 people. About 40 Jews in Easton belonged to the temple, which had no rabbi or cantor at the time. Four or five community members kept a kosher home, driving to Baltimore to purchase kosher meat.

In June 2018, the congregation moved to a new and larger building. The new building is more accessible for elderly and disabled members. The congregation had quadrupled in membership since 1951, having around 200 members. Rabbi Peter Hyman has been the temple's rabbi since 2009.

References

External links
B'nai Israel Easton official website
Temple B’nai Israel of Easton Maryland, World Union for Progressive Judaism

1951 establishments in Maryland
Easton, Maryland
Reform synagogues in Maryland